Kamel Kardjena (born May 26, 1981) is a Paralympic athlete from Algeria. He has cerebral palsy and competes in seated throwing events in the F33 classification.

He competed in the 2008 Summer Paralympics in Beijing, China, where he won a gold medal in the men's F33-34/52 shot put event. He repeated his performance at the 2012 Summer Paralympics in London, winning the gold medal in the men's F32-33 shot put event.

He is F33 world record holder in shot put. He set this record at the 2011 IPC Athletics World Championships is Christchurch.

At 2016 Summer Paralympics in Rio de Janeiro he won the silver medal in men's F33 shot put event.

Personal
Kardjena was born in Oran, Algeria.

References

External links
 
 London2012 Profile

Paralympic athletes of Algeria
Paralympic gold medalists for Algeria
Living people
Sportspeople from Oran
1981 births
Athletes (track and field) at the 2008 Summer Paralympics
Athletes (track and field) at the 2012 Summer Paralympics
Athletes (track and field) at the 2016 Summer Paralympics
Athletes (track and field) at the 2020 Summer Paralympics
Paralympic bronze medalists for Algeria
World record holders in Paralympic athletics
Medalists at the 2008 Summer Paralympics
Medalists at the 2012 Summer Paralympics
Medalists at the 2016 Summer Paralympics
Medalists at the 2020 Summer Paralympics
Paralympic medalists in athletics (track and field)
21st-century Algerian people
Algerian shot putters
20th-century Algerian people